Star Awards 2007 was a television award ceremony held in Singapore. It is part of the annual Star Awards organised by MediaCorp for MediaCorp TV Channel 8. It was the first Star Awards ceremony to be broadcast in two weeks putting emphasis on two programmes; the first ceremony, broadcast on 9 December 2007, titled 红星大奖之戏剧情牵25 (lit. Star Awards 25th Drama Anniversary), commentating 25 years of drama in the Television in Singapore (the ceremony would later become a legacy of having a separate presentation of Professional and Technical awards, which would not happen until Star Awards 2010). The second show, airing 16 December 2007, would be a regular ceremony.

The 2007 ceremony was notable as it was the last ceremony to be held at the end of the year (months of December). Starting on the next ceremony of 2009, until its first exception in 2020, all the future Star Awards ceremonies would be held on the months of April (2020's ceremony however, due to the COVID-19 pandemic, resulted in the postponement of the ceremony till later date). It was also the first ceremony not to present the All-time Favourite Artiste award since the inception of the category in 2004.

Winners and nominees
Unless otherwise stated, the winners are listed first, highlighted in boldface, or highlighted.

Prelude to Star Awards 2007
A nine-episode Prelude series, titled 星光隧道 (lit. "Starlight Tunnel"), premiered on 18 October 2007 every Thursdays with Kym Ng and Dasmond Koh as hosts. The series featuring guest artistes from MediaCorp who would will be playing games with family contestants relating to the every MediaCorp produced dramas. Charlyn Lin co-hosted the islandwide roadshows to rally for the 40 nominated artistes for the Top 10 Most Popular Artistes.

Star Awards 25th Drama Anniversary (红星大奖之戏剧情牵25)
The first week of the Star Awards 2007 ceremony, titled Star Awards 25th Drama Anniversary (红星大奖之戏剧情牵25) was a special addition to the usual Star Awards in tribute to the 25th anniversary of Chinese MediaCorp drama production industries. Guo Liang and Quan Yi Fong were the hosts while Bryan Wong and Michelle Chia co-hosted for one segment. Charlyn Lin was the backstage host.

Unlike regular award ceremonies, most of the awards does not have presenters (and no handover of awards), and instead replaced by a clip show of various drama scenes.

Awards Eligible for Audience Voting
Six out of 11 categories awarded were decided by public voting; these results were all reflected on this list:

Awards decided By Professional Judges
The other five awards are determined by professional judges. The table lists only the winners, in alphabetical order.

Xie was absent in the award ceremony, and was unable to receive his "My Favourite Actor" award.

Star Awards 2007 Awards Ceremony
The second week of Star Awards 2007, broadcast on 16 December 2007, was the main ceremony.

Backstage Achievement Awards Ceremony
As like preceding ceremonies, Professional and Technical Awards were presented before the main ceremony via a clip montage due to time constraints. The lists of winners are only reflected in the table.

Main Ceremony

Viewership Awards

Popularity awards

Presenters and performers
The following individuals presented awards or performed musical numbers.

25th Drama Anniversary

Main Show

Accolades
The first show (25th Drama Anniversary) was nominated for the Best Variety Special in the 2009 ceremony, but lost to MediaCorp 45th Anniversary Gala (45载光芒8方贺台庆).

External links
Star Awards 2007 Official Website
News on Star Awards 25th Drama Anniversary Show
Mediacorp Channel 8 Website
Best Categories Nominees announced!
Star Awards 2007 news
Nominees for Popularity Awards announced!

2007 television awards
Star Awards